The Dream of Ravan appeared originally in a series of articles in the Dublin University Magazine in 1853 and 1854. By some, it is believed to have been written by Mahatma Kuthumi. It was later reprinted as a book. It is a mystical treatise on Ravana, the primary antagonist in the Ramayana, and on its symbolic dream.

References

External links
Full text
 Portuguese translation: Anónimo, "O Sonho de Rāvaṇa: Um tratado místico da Índia", (tradução e notas Ricardo Louro Martins), Lisboa, Edições Nova Acrópole, 2014

1853 documents
1854 documents
Works based on the Ramayana